David Gene Pearson (December 22, 1934 – November 12, 2018) was an American stock car driver, who raced from 1960 to 1986 in the former NASCAR Grand National and Winston Cup Series (now called the NASCAR Cup Series), most notably driving the No. 21 Mercury for Wood Brothers Racing. Pearson won the 1960 NASCAR Rookie of the Year award and three Cup Series championships (1966, 1968, and 1969). He never missed a race in the years he was active. NASCAR described his 1974 season as an indication of his "consistent greatness", finishing third in the season points having competed in only 19 of 30 races. Pearson's career paralleled Richard Petty's, the driver who has won the most races in NASCAR history. They accounted for 63 first/second-place finishes, with the edge going to Pearson. Petty had 200 wins in 1,184 starts, while Pearson had 105 wins in 574 starts. Pearson was nicknamed the "Fox" (and later the "Silver Fox") for his calculated approach to racing.

At his finalist nomination for NASCAR Hall of Fame's inaugural 2010 class, NASCAR described Pearson as "... the model of NASCAR efficiency during his career. With little exaggeration, when Pearson showed up at a race track, he won." Pearson ended his career in 1986, and holds the second position on NASCAR's all-time win list with 105 victories; as well as achieving 113 pole positions. Pearson was successful in different venues of racing; he won three times on road courses, 48 times on superspeedways, 54 times on short tracks, and had 23 dirt track wins. Pearson finished with at least one Top 10 finish in each of his 27 seasons. ESPN described him as being a "plain-spoken, humble man, and that added up to very little charisma."

Petty had high praises for Pearson, saying, "He could beat you on a short track, he could beat you on a superspeedway, he could beat you on a road course, he could beat you on a dirt track. It didn't hurt as bad to lose to Pearson as it did to some of the others, because I knew how good he was." Pearson said of Petty: "I always felt that if I beat him I beat the best, and I heard he said the same thing about me." Petty went further by saying that he believed Pearson would have pulled off 200 victories like him, if he ran the full schedules of NASCAR racing.

Background
Pearson was born near Spartanburg, South Carolina. When Pearson was young, he climbed a tree at the local stock car racing track (Spartanburg Fairgrounds) to see the races. Pearson said, "I'd always been interested in cars, and I decided right then that was what I wanted to do with my life." He worked with his brother in a car body repair shop and used the money earned to purchase a Ford coach. Pearson removed the fenders to convert the vehicle into a street rod. He jumped the car over ditches until he rolled it over. His mother paid him to junk the car, and he used the money to purchase another car to build. In 1952, he raced a 1940 Ford at dirt tracks and won $30 in an outlaw class race. He kept winning and attracted the attention of Spartanburg's racing community, including Joe Littlejohn.

Career

1960s
Pearson began racing in NASCAR's Grand National series during the 1960 season shortly after winning the 1959 track championship at Greenville-Pickens Speedway. His first NASCAR start was the first 1960 Daytona 500 qualifying race and he finished 17th in a self-owned car that he had purchased from Jack White. He started 22 events that season, finishing 23rd in season points and was voted the 1960 NASCAR Rookie of the Year. His season was highlighted by a second-place finish at Gamecock Speedway (Sumter, South Carolina), a fourth-place finish at Hickory Motor Speedway and fifth after starting on the pole position at his hometown track at Piedmont Interstate Fairgrounds in Spartanburg.

When Pearson bent the frame of his own race car early in the 1961 season, he began working as a house roofer in Spartanburg to support his family, which included two sons. Darel Dieringer had a contract dispute with a tire company and was not able to compete in the inaugural World 600 at Charlotte. Littlejohn was at the track, and he recommended that car builder Ray Fox hire Pearson. Pearson was unsure if he should join the team, and Fox was not convinced that he should trust his car to the relatively untested 26-year-old driver.

After Pearson had a successful test run, he qualified the car with the third fastest time behind Richard Petty and Joe Weatherly. Pearson raced his way into the lead early in the event and was the leader after the first round of pit stops. Pearson and Petty were the only two cars on the lead lap by a restart on the 311th lap (of 400). Petty made up six seconds on Pearson in 20 laps before Petty had to retire with a blown engine. Pearson held a three lap lead over Fireball Roberts and was leading late in the race until he ran over some debris on the backstretch and blew a tire with only two laps remaining.

He started in 19 races during the 1961 season and he had three wins to finish thirteenth in season points, winning his first NASCAR race in a Fox-prepared car at Concord Speedway. Later in the season, he won the Firecracker 250 at Daytona and the Dixie 400 at Atlanta.

Pearson started in only 12 of 53 events in 1962 yet managed to finish tenth in season points. Pearson began the season racing for Fox until Fox retired; he started for Petty Enterprises, Cotton Owens, and Bud Moore that season. He had seven top ten finishes and no wins. During 41 starts in 55 races, Pearson finished the 1963 season sixth in points for Cotton Owens. He held two pole positions and had no wins.

In 1964, he had eight wins at Richmond, Greenville-Pickens Speedway, Occoneechee Speedway, Boyd Speedway, Lincoln Speedway, Rambi Raceway, Columbia Speedway and Hickory Motor Speedway. Pearson finished third in the championship, which was won by Petty for the first time. He qualified on the pole position for 12 events.

NASCAR banned the Mopar Hemi engine in 1965, so Petty and Pearson boycotted many races rather than compete with a non-competitive engine against Ford and Mercury drivers. Both competed in drag racing. Pearson drove a Dodge Dart station wagon nicknamed the "Cotton Picker" for Owens. NASCAR owner Bill France, Sr. adjusted the engine rules later in the season to bring back Mopar drivers; Petty and Pearson ended up competing in 14 of 55 events. Pearson won two of the final 21 races (Columbia and Richmond) to finish 40th in the season points.

In his second full-time season, Pearson won his first of three NASCAR championships in 1966. He won 15 of 49 events, which was the second most in NASCAR history at that time. Early in the season, Pearson won at Hickory, Columbia, Greenville-Pickens, and Winston-Salem Speedway to complete four straight victories. Throughout the season, Pearson won at Richmond, Dog Track Speedway, New Asheville Speedway, Smokey Mountain Raceway, the second Greenville-Pickens race, Bridgehampton Race Circuit, Fonda Speedway, Bowman Gray Stadium, and the second Richmond race.

Pearson ran a partial season in 1967, competing in 22 of 48 races. He began the season racing for Cotton Owens before switching after the thirteenth race to Holman Moody. Pearson quit after there was a misunderstanding about who would drive the team's tow truck. Dodge decided to stop racing in NASCAR, so Pearson switched away from Owen's Dodges in favor of Holman Moody's Fords. He had two wins (Bristol, Greenville-Pickens), both for Owens, in a season that was dominated by Petty's all-time record 27 victories (including all-time record 10 straight). Pearson finished seventh in season points.

In the second season of running the full schedule, Petty and Pearson each won 16 races during 1968; Pearson won the championship and Petty finished third. Pearson competed primarily for Holman-Moody, winning at Bristol, Richmond, North Wilkesboro, Asheville-Weaverville Speedway, Darlington, Beltsville Speedway, Langley Field Speedway, Charlotte, Middle Georgia Raceway, Bristol, Nashville Speedway, Columbia, Bowman-Gray, Asheville-Weaverville, Hickory, and Augusta Speedway. He added twelve pole positions.

Pearson won his third and final championship in his final season running the full schedule in 1969. The championship tied Pearson with Lee Petty for the most championships in NASCAR history (Richard Petty, Dale Earnhardt and Jimmie Johnson hold the current record with seven titles each).

In 51 starts, he had 11 wins, 42 top-fives, and 44 top-tens. He earned a record $229,760 for his effort. Pearson completed 14,270 laps in 1969, which is the most laps ever in a NASCAR Cup season. He was one of eleven drivers to boycott the first race at Talladega after concerns with the tires; he rejoined the tour at the following event.

1970s

The 1970 season started with Pearson competing part-time, as he would for the rest of his career. Pearson led the Daytona 500 under caution with 13 laps remaining and changed only his right side tires in a two-tire pit stop. Pete Hamilton did a four-tire stop and passed Pearson after the restart for the victory. In 19 starts, he won a single race (Darlington) and earned two pole positions (Bristol, Darlington) to finish 23rd in points.

R. J. Reynolds began sponsoring NASCAR in 1971 and the Grand National series was retitled the Winston Cup Series. Holman Moody and Pearson split near the middle of the season after Pearson refused to take a 10% pay cut. He won two races before the split (Daytona Twin 125 and Bristol) and four-second-place finishes. Pearson finished the season by competing in seven races for Ray Nichels. He recorded one top-ten finish (eighth at the July Daytona race), but suffered mechanical problems in all of the other races. For the season he finished 51st in points after competing in 17 races with nine top-tens and eight top-fives.

At R. J. Reynolds' request, NASCAR began cutting down on the number of races in 1972 season by eliminating midweek races. It also dropped 13 short tracks and had a 31-race schedule. Pearson began racing for the Wood Brothers that season. He raced in 17 of the events and had six wins, which earned him a 20th-place finish in the season points. Pearson was racing against Bobby Isaac and Buddy Baker at the end of the Winston 500 at Talladega Superspeedway when Jimmy Crawford spun into Isaac; Pearson won the race. He won later that season at the Firecracker 400, a race that he would win three straight times.

While Pearson only started in 18 (of 28) races during 1973, he was named the NASCAR driver of the Year after finishing eighth in points. He won 11 of those 18 races in the Wood Brothers Mercury. His 61% win percentage is the highest in NASCAR history. He had wins at North Carolina Motor Speedway (Rockingham), Atlanta, Darlington, Martinsville, Talladega, Dover, Michigan, second Daytona race, second Atlanta race, second Dover race, and the second Rockingham race. The remaining seven races contained four Did Not Finishes (DNFs), two-second-place finishes and one third place. At the first Rockingham event, Pearson led 499 of 500 miles, giving up the lead only for a pit stop. He won eight pole positions with a 3.4 average starting position.

Pearson finished third in the 1974 points after competing in 19 of 30 events. It was the only season where drivers were awarded points based on their money earnings, which ended up rewarding drivers who finished high in the big-money races. He won seven races, including the Winston 500 by 0.17 seconds over Benny Parsons. Pearson began to earn the nickname of "silver fox" after the 1974 Firecracker 400. Entering the final lap, he was leading followed closely by Petty. Fearing that Petty would do a slingshot pass, he slowed a little, pulled his car off to the side to simulate a blown motor, and threw his hand up in the air as a motion of defeat. Petty quickly passed opening a lead of several car lengths exiting turn 2.Using the draft, Pearson closed in quickly down the backstretch and through turns 3 and 4 and drew right behind Petty. Coming out of the final corner, Pearson pulled to the inside and did a slingshot pass back to win the race by a car length. The International Race of Champions (IROC) invited him to participate in their first annual all-star stock car racing series for the 1973–74 season and he finished fourth of the twelve drivers.

In 1975, NASCAR changed to the points system that it would use for nearly three decades until the current Chase for the Cup format was implemented in 2004. ABC televised the second half of the 1975 Daytona 500 and drew a 10.5 rating opposite an 8.6 rating for an NBA game and a 4.1 for a NHL game. Pearson took the lead back from Benny Parsons on lap 177 and began to pull away. Petty, who was 8 laps down after several unscheduled pit stops due to engine overheating, began drafting with Parsons and the duo started closing on Pearson. With less than 3 laps to go Pearson collided Cale Yarborough on the backstretch and spun out into the grass. Parsons won the race by a lap over Bobby Allison. After the race, Pearson complained that Petty showed favoritism by helping Parsons. His attempt to win his third consecutive Winston 500 fell short when he was unable to catch Baker. Despite these near-wins, he won three times in 21 attempts. He finished 14th in points in the 30–event season. He competed in the second annual IROC season during 1974/75 and he finished sixth in points.

The 1976 Daytona 500 is known for the final lap battle between Pearson and Petty. In 2007, ESPN rated the race as the fourth most interesting Daytona 500. Petty was leading Pearson going into the last lap by a couple of car lengths. Pearson used the draft to attempt a slingshot pass against Petty at the end of the back stretch on the last lap, but his car pushed high into the final turn while going around another car. Petty edged under Pearson, and their cars crashed into each other on the frontstretch in the final turns. They both spun out into the infield grass approximately  short of the finish line. Benny Parsons who was driving the third place car, was over a lap behind the disabled cars. With Petty unable to restart his car, Pearson slowly drove his Wood Brothers Mercury over the grassy infield past the finish line for his only Daytona 500 victory. He won a series-best ten races in 1976, but finished ninth in season points after competing in only 22 of 30 events. He won his only IROC race at the first race of IROC III in 1975/1976 at Michigan International Speedway and finished fifth in points.

Pearson finished 13th in the 1977 NASCAR points, with two wins in 22 (of 30) races. IROC invited him to participate in IROC IV in 1976/77 and he finished ninth in the four race series.

He competed in 22 races (of 30) again in 1978, winning four times for a 16th-place finish in the season points. In March, Pearson won his 100th Winston Cup race at Rockingham. Late in the World 600, Pearson was battling for the win against Parsons until Parsons' spin collected both drivers. Darrell Waltrip edged Donnie Allison for the victory. Pearson competed in his final IROC race in June 1978 during IROC V.

Pearson began 1979 by winning the pole position at year's first race at Riverside; he finished in second place. 1979 was Pearson's final season racing for the Wood Brothers, with his last race happening at Darlington. After a miscommunication, he left the pits without waiting for the pit crew to place lug nuts on the car and the tires fell off the car when he reached the end of pit lane. Pearson quit the team after the race. Pearson had won 43 races between 1972 and 79 while driving for the Wood Brothers. Later during the season, Rod Osterlund's rookie driver, Dale Earnhardt, suffered a shoulder injury. Osterlund hired Pearson to replace Earnhardt during four races; he collected the pole position at Michigan and won the 1979 Southern 500. For the season, Pearson had competed in nine races and finished 32nd in points. Fans voted him as NASCAR's Most Popular Driver.

1980s
Pearson raced for Hoss Ellington during the 1980 season. He won the 1980 CRC Chemicals Rebel 500 at Darlington for his final Cup win. He started nine times to finish 37th in season points. Pearson qualified on the pole position at Charlotte for his eleventh straight time and he had started on the front row in fifteen straight races between 1972 and 1980. In 1981, he raced in six races for four owners. His season was highlighted by winning the pole position for Kennie Childers at Dover and two Top 10 finishes at Darlington.

Bobby Hawkins hired Pearson to race in six events during 1982. He started on the pole position at Charlotte and Darlington and had top five finishes at the July Daytona race and Charlotte. He ended the 30-race season in 37th place in the point standings. Pearson entered his first NASCAR Busch Grand National (now Xfinity Series) race that season. He won the pole position for that race at Bristol and he finished second. Pearson raced in two more Busch races that season (Dover, North Carolina), starting second and first; he finished fifth and first. The North Carolina win was his only Busch victory.

Pearson raced in ten events for Hawkins in 1983. He had four top ten finishes, including eighth and third-place finishes at Daytona, and finished 33rd in points. He started from the pole position for his final Busch Grand National race at Dover; it resulted in a twelfth-place finish. In 1984, Pearson raced in eleven events for Hawkins and finished 41st in the season points. He had three top ten finishes, all ninth-place finishes, at the Daytona 500, World 600, and the Miller 400.

Pearson raced in twelve races during 1985, the first eight for Hoss Ellington and the final four for himself. He had an average start of 9.2, but ten DNFs resulted in an average finish over 30th place. He had one top ten finish at the July Daytona race and finished 36th in points. 1986 was Pearson's final season in NASCAR. Pearson drove his own car in two events. After a DNF at Charlotte, he finished tenth in his final race at the August Michigan event.

After a three-year hiatus, Pearson planned to come out of retirement in 1989, replacing the injured Neil Bonnett in the Wood Brothers' No. 21 at Charlotte Motor Speedway. Following testing for the event, however, he suffered severe neck and back pain, and chose instead to announce his retirement; Tommy Ellis replaced Pearson for the race.

Legacy
The National Motor Sports Press Association's Hall of Fame inducted Pearson in 1991, and inducted into the Motorsports Hall of Fame of America in 1993. He was inducted in the International Motorsports Hall of Fame in 1993 and the Charlotte Motor Speedway Court of Legends in 1998. He was one of ten finalists for the Driver of the Quarter Century (1967–91) sponsored by a United States businessman; Mario Andretti won the award. In mid-1999, Sports Illustrated used votes from 40 NASCAR insiders to name Pearson the Top Stock Car Driver of the Twentieth Century.

In 2009, Pearson was one of the 25 nominees for the first class to be inducted into the NASCAR Hall of Fame. NASCAR named the five people to be inducted in its 2010 class and it stated that he finished between sixth and eighth place. Pearson left the premises ten minutes after the inductees were announced. The snub drew public criticism and some writers predicted that he will be the headliner for the 2011 class.

At the induction ceremony, Pearson said that he felt the inaugural class should include more pioneers such as Raymond Parks, Tim Flock, and Lee Petty. Pearson said "I feel like if I was going in next year and I knew Raymond Parks wasn't, I'd withdraw my name to get him in." In 2010, Pearson was named to the 2011 class in the NASCAR Hall of Fame. He received the most votes, from 50 of 53 voters. "I am just proud that that many people thought enough to vote for me", Pearson said. He added that he had not felt slighted by Bill France Jr. beating him into the 2010 class by one vote. He was inducted into the NASCAR Hall of Fame on May 23, 2011.

Motorsports career results

NASCAR
(key) (Bold – Pole position awarded by qualifying time. Italics – Pole position earned by points standings or practice time. * – Most laps led.)

Grand National Series

Winston Cup Series

Daytona 500

Budweiser Late Model Sportsman Series

International Race of Champions
(key) (Bold – Pole position. * – Most laps led.)

Personal life
Pearson's wife Helen Ruth Pearson predeceased him in 1991. He had three sons, Larry Pearson, Ricky Pearson, and Eddie Pearson. Larry raced in NASCAR and he was the 1986 and 1987 Busch Series champion. Ricky Pearson was general manager and a crew chief for Buckshot Jones/Buckshot Racing when they won two Busch Series races.

In December 2014, Pearson suffered a mild stroke which partially paralyzed the left half of his body, from which he recovered. Pearson died on November 12, 2018, in Spartanburg, South Carolina, at the age of 83. No cause was given.

References

External links

1934 births
2018 deaths
American Speed Association drivers
International Motorsports Hall of Fame inductees
International Race of Champions drivers
NASCAR Cup Series champions
NASCAR drivers
Racing drivers from South Carolina
Sportspeople from Spartanburg, South Carolina
Trans-Am Series drivers
NASCAR Hall of Fame inductees